Oscar D. Hollenbeck was an American football coach and player. He served as the head football coach at Westminster College in New Wilmington, Pennsylvania for one season, in 1910, compiling a record of 6–2. He played college football at Colgate University, lettering from 1907 to 1909. He spent one year with the Akron Indians of the Ohio League.

Head coaching record

References

Year of birth missing
Year of death missing
American football centers
American football guards
Akron Indians (Ohio League) players
Colgate Raiders football players
Westminster Titans football coaches